The Godfathers are a hip hop duo consisting of Kool G Rap and Necro. Their debut album Once Upon a Crime was released on November 19, 2013.

Discography

Albums
 2013: Once Upon a Crime

Mixtapes
 2011: The Pre-Kill Volume I 
 2012: The Pre-Kill Volume II

References

External links
 The Godfathers on Facebook 
 Kool G Rap on Facebook (archived)
 Necro Official website

American musical duos
Hip hop duos
Hip hop groups from New York City
Hardcore hip hop groups
2011 establishments in New York City